Carlos Blanco may refer to:
Carlos Blanco (baseball) (born 1914), Cuban professional baseball player
Carlos Blanco (footballer, born 1928) (1928–2011), Spanish-born Mexican footballer
Carlos Blanco (footballer, born 1996), Spanish footballer
Carlos Blanco (writer) (born 1986), Spanish writer
Carlos Blanco Hernández (1917–2013), Spanish screenwriter, see Locura de amor
Carlos Blanco Vila (born 1959), Spanish actor born in Vilagarcía de Arousa
Carlos José Blanco Smith (born 1985), Australian rugby union player who competes for the Spain national team

See also
Juan Carlos Blanco (disambiguation)